The Grand Prix de la Ville de Nice is a steeplechase race reserved for Group 3 five-year-olds and older. This test is run over a distance of 4,600 metres and takes place in January on the racetrack of Cagnes-sur-Mer. The current purse is €140,000.

See also 
 Cagnes-sur-Mer
 Hippodrome de la Côte d'Azur

References

Steeplechase (horse racing)
Horse races in France

 galopp-sieger.de - Grand Prix de la Ville de Nice